Birshreshtha Noor Mohammad Public College (BNMPC) (formerly Rifles Public School and College) is a Bangladeshi school and college located at the headquarters of Border Guard Bangladesh in Pilkhana. Although originally established to ensure the education of the children of Border Guards Bangladesh (former Bangladesh Rifles) members but civilians can also study here. Major General Shakil Ahmed is the Chief patron of the college, Brigadier General Benazir Ahmed is the chairperson of the governing body, and Lieutenant Colonel Md. Mizanur Rahaman is the principal.

History 
Birshrestha Noor Mohammad Public College was established in 1977 in Pilkhana which contains the headquarters of the Bangladesh Border Guards. It was named after Lance naik Nur Mohammad Sheikh, who served in Bangladesh Rifles and died in action during Bangladesh Liberation War. For his actions during the war he was awarded the highest gallantry award of Bangladesh, Bir Sreshtho. The classes for secondary school began in 1978 and students first sat for the Secondary School Certificate examinations in 1980. Birshrestha Noor Mohammad Rifles Public School was upgraded to Birshrestha Noor Mohammad Rifles Public School & College in 1983 and students from the college first sat for the Higher Secondary Certificate examinations in 1985. The school adopted the English version of the national curriculum in 2004.

The Director General of the Border Guards Bangladesh serves as the chief patron of the college. The school has more than three thousand students of whom 14 percent are related to Border Guards Bangladesh personnel. It was one of the top ten best performing schools in Higher Secondary Certificate examinations in Bangladesh in 2009.

On 29 November 2021, students of Birshrestha Noor Mohammad Public College protested for safe roads in Nilkhet.

Notable faculty 

 Jharna Rahman

References 

Schools in Dhaka District
Colleges in Dhaka District
Educational Institutions affiliated with Bangladesh Army
1977 establishments in Bangladesh